Metzneria lepigrei is a moth of the family Gelechiidae. It was described by Daniel Lucas in 1935. It is found in Algeria.

References

Moths described in 1935
Metzneria